The women's 100 metres T54 event at the 2020 Summer Paralympics in Tokyo, took place on 1 September 2021.

Records
Prior to the competition, the existing records were as follows:

Results

Heats
Heat 1 took place on 1 September 2021, at 12:15:

Heat 2 took place on 1 September 2021, at 12:22:

Final
The final took place on 1 September 2021, at 20:46:

References

Women's 100 metres T54
2021 in women's athletics